Iqbal Singh Chahal is a 1989 batch IAS officer of Maharashtra cadre. He is currently the Municipal Commissioner & Administrator of Brihanmumbai Municipal Corporation (BMC). Mr. Chahal has served Government of Maharashtra and India in various capacities. In his initial career he was collector of Thane and Chhatrappati Sambhaji Maharaj Nagar districts, later on he was Joint Secretary in Ministry of Home Affairs, Ministry of Women & Child Development and Ministry of Panchayati Raj. Following that he was also Principal Secretary in Water Resources Department and Urban Development Department of Maharashtra.

Notable Works
Chahal is widely given the credit for keeping COVID-19 under check in Mumbai. Supreme Court of India and High Court of Maharashtra also lauded Chahal for his Mumbai Model.

He added thousands of beds through new field hospitals, and private facilities handed over their COVID-19 wards to the government with 800 vehicles being turned into ambulances. A proactive approach was used to focus on 55 slums including, Dharavi, where a strict lock-down was accompanied by aggressive sanitation of public toilets, mass coronavirus screening and a huge volunteer effort to ensure that nobody went hungry. All positive test reports in Mumbai were routed through "war rooms".

He received Newsmakers Achievers Awards in 2021.

References

Living people
Mumbai civic officials
Indian Administrative Service officers
Year of birth missing (living people)